The Northern Iowa Panthers football represents the University of Northern Iowa in college football at the NCAA Division I Football Championship Subdivision (FCS) level as member of the Missouri Valley Football Conference (MVFC). The program began in 1895 and has fielded a team every year since with the exceptions of 1906–1907 and 1943–1944. The Panthers play their home games at the UNI-Dome on the campus of the University of Northern Iowa, in Cedar Falls, Iowa.

History

Classifications
 NCAA College Division (1956–1972)
 NCAA Division II (1973–1980)
 NCAA Division I-AA/FCS (1981–present)

Conference memberships
 Independent (1895–1922)
 Iowa Intercollegiate Athletic Conference (1923–1934)
 North Central Intercollegiate Athletic Conference (1935–1977)
 Mid-Continent Conference (1978–1984)
 Gateway Football Conference/Missouri Valley Football Conference (1985–present)

Championship and postseason history

Conference championships

Northern Iowa has won thirty-three conference titles, the most out of the four Iowa Division I institutions. The Panthers have won two Iowa Intercollegiate Athletic Conference championships, twelve North Central Conference championships, three Association of Mid-Continent Universities football championships and sixteen Missouri Valley Football Conference championships.

College Division bowl games
Northern Iowa played in the NCAA's College Division from 1937–1972. Twice in those years they qualified for a College Division bowl game.

FCS playoff games
The Panthers have reached the NCAA Division I Football Championship playoffs 22 times, with a record of 24–22.

1985 
- First Round Bye 
- Quarterfinals W Middle Tennessee 28-21 
- Semifinals L Georgia Southern 40-33

1987 
- First Round W Youngstown 31-28 
- Quarterfinals W Arkansas State 49-28 
- Semifinals L NE Louisiana 44-41

1990
- First Round L 20-3

1991 
- First Round W Weber State 38-21
- Quarterfinals L Marshall 41-13

1992 
- First Round W EWU 17-14 
- Quarterfinals W McNeese State 29-7 
- Semifinals L YSU 19-7

1993
- First Round L Boston University 27-21

1994
- First Round L Montana 23-29

1995 
- First Round W Murray State 35-34 
- Quarterfinals L Marshall 41-24

1996 
- First Round Bye 
- Quarterfinals W William & Mary 38-35 
- Semifinals L Marshall 31-14

2001 
- First Round W Eastern Illinois 49-43 
- Quarterfinals W Maine 56-28 
- Semifinals L Montana 38-10

2003 
- First Round W Montana State 35-14 
- Quarterfinals L Delaware 37-7

2005 
- First Round Bye 
- Quarterfinals W New Hampshire 24-21 
- Semifinals W Texas State 40-37 
- National Championship L App State 21-16

2007 
- First Round W New Hampshire 38-35 
- Quarterfinals L Delaware 39-27

2008 
- First Round W Maine 40-15 
- Quarterfinals W New Hampshire 36-34 
- Semifinals L Richmond 21-20

2010 
- First Round L Lehigh 14-7

2011 
- First Round Bye 
- Second Round W Wofford 28-21 
- Quarterfinals L Montana 48-10

2014
- First Round W Stephen F. Austin 44-10
- Second Round L Illinois State 41-21 

2015 
- First Round W Eastern Illinois 53-17 
- Second Round W Portland State 29-17 
- Quarterfinals L NDSU 23-13

2017 
- First Round W Monmouth 46-7 
- Second Round L SDSU 37-22 

2018 
- First Round W Lamar 16-3 
- Second Round L UC Davis 23-16

2019 
- First Round W San Diego 17-3
- Second Round W SDSU 13-10
- Quarterfinals L JMU 0-17

2021
- First Round L Eastern Washington 19-9

FCS National Championship games

UNI-Dome
The UNI-Dome opened in 1976, as the home of the UNI Panthers football team. The facility's capacity for football is 16,324.
At football games, where cold temperatures are frequently an issue for fans, the UNI-Dome announcers will announce "conditions at game time" prior to each game. The announcers will announce the weather in the town where the visiting team is from, the current weather conditions outside the Dome, and then say "Inside - 72 degrees, no wind, welcome to the Dome!" to emphasize the fact that a domed stadium is not affected by the weather. Heading into the 2021 Fall season, the Panthers have a home record of 221-59-1 in the UNI-Dome, having won nearly 80 percent of their games in the UNI-Dome.

All-Americans
First Team Selections 

 Paul Jones, E, 1937 (WR)
 Paul DeVan, HB, 1949 (AP)
 Lou Bohnsack, C, 1952 (AP)
 LeRoy Dunn, T, 1955 (WR)
 Dick Formanek, T, 1956 (WR)
 George Asleson, G, 1960 (AP)
 Jerry Morgan, QB, 1960 (WR)
 Wendell Williams, G, 1961 (AP)
 Dan Boals, FB, 1962 (WR)
 Randy Schultz, FB, 1964 and 1965 (AP)
 Ray Pedersen, G, 1967 (AP)
 Mike Timmermans, T, 1975 (AP)
 Brian Mitchell, PK, 1990 and 1991 (AP)
 Kenny Shedd, AP, 1992 (AP)
 William Freeney, LB, 1992 (AP)
 Andre Allen, LB, 1994 (AP)
 Dedric Ward, WR, 1995 and 1996 (AP)
 Brad Meester, C, 1999 (AP)
 Adam Vogt, LB, 2001 (AP)
 Mackenzie Hoambrecker, PK, 2002 (AP)
 Dre Dokes, DB, 2006 (AP)
 Brannon Carter, LB, 2007 (AP)
 Chad Rinehart, OL, 2007 (AP)
 James Ruffin, DL, 2009 (AP)
 Ben Boothby, DL, 2011 (AP)
 Michael Schmadeke, PK, 2014 (AP)
 Jack Rummells, OL, 2014 (AP)
 Deiondre' Hall, DB, 2015 (AP)
 Karter Schult, DL, 2016 (AP)
 Jared Brinkman, DL, 2020-21c and 2021 (AP)
 Trevor Penning, OL, 2021

WR=Williamson Ratings; AP=Associated Press;

c - 2020-21 selections include players who played Fall 2020 and teams (such as Northern Iowa) which moved their schedule to Spring 2021 due to COVID

Notable players

 Willie Beamon
 Eddie Berlin
 Spencer Brown
 Mark Farley
 L. J. Fort
 Daurice Fountain
 Derrick Frost
 Joe Fuller
 Mike Furrey
 Deiondre' Hall
 Ryan Hannam
 Austin Howard
 David Johnson
 James Jones
 Brandon Keith
 Chris Klieman
 Joshua Mahoney
 Brad Meester
 Larry Miller
 Brian Mitchell
 Bryce Paup
 Trevor Penning
 Chad Rinehart
 Eric Sanders 
 Benny Sapp
 Randy Schultz
 Terrell Sinkfield
 Varmah Sonie
 Justin Surrency
 Tanner Varner
 Dedric Ward
 Kurt Warner
 Xavier Williams
 Mike Woodley
 Steve Wright

References

External links
 

 
American football teams established in 1895
1895 establishments in Iowa